Newman Island is an ice-covered island  long, lying in the Nickerson Ice Shelf on the coast of Marie Byrd Land, Antarctica. It was mapped from surveys by the United States Geological Survey (USGS) and U.S. Navy air photos (1959–65), and named by the Advisory Committee on Antarctic Names (US-ACAN) for Cdr. J.F. Newman, USN, ships officer on the staff of the Commander, Task Force 43, during Operation Deep Freeze 1966.

References

Islands of Marie Byrd Land